The Women's 400 metres T37 event at the 2012 Summer Paralympics took place at the London Olympic Stadium from 6 to 8 September. The event consisted of 2 heats and a final.

Records
Prior to the competition, the existing World and Paralympic records were as follows:

Results

Round 1
Competed 6 September 2012 from 10:44. Qual. rule: first 3 in each heat (Q) plus the 2 fastest other times (q) qualified.

Heat 1

Heat 2

Final
Competed 8 September 2012 at 11:48.

 
Q = qualified by place. q = qualified by time. RR = Regional Record. PB = Personal Best. SB = Seasonal Best. DNS = Did not start.

References

Athletics at the 2012 Summer Paralympics
2012 in women's athletics